Antonio Pacheco Ruiz (born 3 January 2002) is a Spanish footballer who plays as a central midfielder for Villarreal CF B.

Club career
Born in Callosa de Segura, Alicante, Valencian Community, Pacheco joined Villarreal CF's youth setup from Kelme CF. He made his senior debut with affiliate club CD Roda on 11 November 2018, coming on as a second-half substitute in a 3–0 Tercera División away loss against CD Eldense.

In 2020, after finishing his formation, Pacheco was assigned to Villarreal's C-team also in the fourth division, but also featured for the reserves in Segunda División B during the season. On 29 January 2021, he renewed his contract with the Yellow Submarine until 2025.

Pacheco featured regularly for the B-side during the 2021–22 campaign, as his side achieved promotion to Segunda División. He made his professional debut in the category on 29 August 2022, replacing Diego Collado in a 3–0 away loss against Granada CF.

References

External links

2002 births
Living people
People from Vega Baja del Segura
Sportspeople from the Province of Alicante
Spanish footballers
Footballers from the Valencian Community
Association football midfielders
Segunda División players
Primera Federación players
Segunda División B players
Tercera División players
Villarreal CF C players
Villarreal CF B players
Spain youth international footballers